The House of Bernarda Alba is a 1987 Spanish drama film directed by Mario Camus. It was screened in the Un Certain Regard section at the 1987 Cannes Film Festival and in the main competition at the 15th Moscow International Film Festival. It is based on the play of the same name by Federico García Lorca.

Filming locations included Madrid and Antequera.

Cast

References

External links

1987 films
1980s Spanish-language films
1987 drama films
Films shot in Madrid
Films shot in the province of Málaga
Films directed by Mario Camus
Spanish drama films
1980s Spanish films